Henrik Ekelund is the founder, President and CEO of BTS Group AB, a global consulting firm headquartered in Stockholm, Sweden.

Henrik Ekelund graduated from the Stockholm School of Economics in 1978.

References

External links

Wall Street Journal Article

Swedish businesspeople
Living people
Swedish consultants
Stockholm School of Economics alumni
Year of birth missing (living people)
Place of birth missing (living people)